The 1974–75 Washington State Cougars men's basketball team represented Washington State University for the 1974–75 NCAA Division I men's basketball season. Led by third-year head coach George Raveling, the Cougars were members of the Pacific-8 Conference and played their home games on campus at the Performing Arts Coliseum in Pullman, Washington.

The sole win came in the last game over rival Washington in Seattle.

The NCAA Tournament expanded to 32 teams this season and for the first time, WSU hosted sub-regional games. Two opening round games in the West regional were played at the  Performing Arts Coliseum on Saturday, March 15, with Montana and eventual champion UCLA advancing.

References

External links
Sports Reference – Washington State Cougars: 1974–75 basketball season

Washington State Cougars men's basketball seasons
Washington State Cougars
Washington State
Washington State